Africoseius is a genus of mites in the family Ascidae.

Species
 Africoseius areolatus Krantz, 1962

References

Ascidae